Loretta Young (born Gretchen Young; January 6, 1913 – August 12, 2000) was an American actress. Starting as a child, she had a long and varied career in film from 1917 to 1953. She won the Academy Award for Best Actress for her role in the film The Farmer's Daughter (1947), and received her second Academy Award nomination for her role in Come to the Stable (1949). Young moved to the relatively new medium of television, where she had a dramatic anthology series, The Loretta Young Show, from 1953 to 1961. It earned three Emmy Awards, and was re-run successfully on daytime TV and later in syndication. In the 1980s, Young returned to the small screen and won a Golden Globe for her role in Christmas Eve in 1986.

Early life
She was born Gretchen Young in Salt Lake City, Utah, the daughter of Gladys (née Royal) and John Earle Young.
She was of Luxembourgish descent. When she was two years old, her parents separated, and when she was three, her mother moved the family to Hollywood. A priest helped Gladys to establish a boarding house as income. Her sister's husband helped the little girls get small parts in silent films for income. Gladys met Ida Botiller Lindley a very wealthy widow, by 1925. Ida had no children, and wanted to carry on her husband's name, proposing that she adopt young John Royal Young, educating him as a lawyer like her husband. Thus, John became John R. Lindley, and became a lawyer. Gretchen and her sisters, Polly Ann and Elizabeth Jane (better known as Sally Blane), all worked as child actresses, but of the three, Gretchen was the most successful. Polly, Sally and John Royal all died in 1997, in their 80s.

Young's first role was at the age of two or three in the silent film Sweet Kitty Bellairs. During her high-school years she was educated at Ramona Convent Secondary School. She was signed to a contract by John McCormick, husband and manager of actress Colleen Moore, who saw the young girl's potential. Moore gave her the name Loretta, explaining that it was the name of her favorite doll.

Career

Early films (1919–1939) 
Young was billed as Gretchen Young in the silent film Sirens of the Sea (1917). She was first billed as Loretta Young in 1928, in The Whip Woman. That same year, she co-starred with Lon Chaney in the MGM film Laugh, Clown, Laugh. The next year, she was named one of the WAMPAS Baby Stars.

In 1930, when she was 17, she eloped with 26-year-old actor Grant Withers; they were married in Yuma, Arizona. The marriage was annulled the next year, just as their second movie together (coincidentally entitled Too Young to Marry) was released.

In 1934, she co-starred with Cary Grant in Born to be Bad, and in 1935 was billed with Clark Gable and Jack Oakie in the film version of Jack London's The Call of the Wild, directed by William Wellman.

1940s films 

During World War II, Young made Ladies Courageous (1944; re-issued as Fury in the Sky), the fictionalized story of the Women's Auxiliary Ferrying Squadron. It depicted a unit of female pilots who flew bomber planes from the factories to their final destinations. Young made as many as eight movies a year, and her films in the 1940s were among the most prestigious and well-remembered of her career.

In 1946, Young made The Stranger, in which she plays a small-town American woman who unknowingly marries a Nazi fugitive (Orson Welles). Welles recalled that the film's producer ordered a close-up of Young during a pivotal scene, a choice that director Welles considered "fatal" to the scene's impact. Young took the director's side, even getting her agent on the phone to take Welles' side. "Imagine getting a star's agent in to ensure that she wouldn't get a closeup!" Welles later said. "She was wonderful." Critic Richard L. Coe of The Washington Post noted, "The languorous Miss Young has the toughest assignment, being called on to shift from the starry-eyed bride of the early reels to the woman who must know in her heart that her husband is one of the most hated of men."

In 1947, Young won an Oscar for her performance in The Farmer's Daughter, a political comedy that required her to learn a Swedish accent. Ruth Roberts, who had coached Ingrid Bergman on how to lose her Swedish accent, taught Young how to gain one. That same year, she co-starred with Cary Grant and David Niven in The Bishop's Wife, a perennial favorite, which was remade in 1996 as The Preacher's Wife starring Denzel Washington, Whitney Houston & Courtney B. Vance. In 1949, she received another Academy Award nomination for Come to the Stable. In 1953, she appeared in her last theatrical film, It Happens Every Thursday, a Universal comedy about a New York couple who move to California to take over a struggling weekly newspaper; her co-star was John Forsythe.

Television

Young hosted and starred in the well-received half-hour anthology television series Letter to Loretta (soon retitled The Loretta Young Show), which was originally broadcast from 1953 to 1961. She earned three Emmy awards for the program. Her trademark was a dramatic entrance through a living room door in various high-fashion evening gowns. She returned at the program's conclusion to offer a brief passage from the Bible or a famous quote that reflected upon the evening's story. (Young's introductions and concluding remarks were not re-run on television because she legally stipulated that they not be, as she did not want the dresses she wore in those segments to make the program seem dated.) The program ran in prime time on NBC for eight years, the longest-running primetime network program hosted by a woman up to that time.

The program was based on the premise that each drama was an answer to a question asked in her fan mail. The title was changed to The Loretta Young Show during the first season (as of the episode of February 14, 1954), and the "letter" concept was dropped at the end of the second season. Toward the end of the second season, Young was hospitalized as a result of overwork, which required a number of guest hosts and guest stars; her first appearance in the 1955–1956 season was for the Christmas show. From then on, Young appeared in only about half of each season's shows as an actress, and served as the program's host for the remainder.

Minus Young's introductions and conclusions, the series was re-run as the Loretta Young Theatre in daytime by NBC from 1960 to 1964. It also appeared in syndication into the early 1970s, before being withdrawn.

Awards

In 1988, Young received the Women in Film Crystal Award for outstanding women who through their endurance and the excellence of their work helped expand the role of women in the entertainment industry.

Young has two stars on the Hollywood Walk of Fame: one for her work in television, at 6135 Hollywood Boulevard, and the other for her work in motion pictures, at 6100 Hollywood Boulevard. In 2011, a Golden Palm Star on the Walk of Stars, in Palm Springs, California, was dedicated to her.

Personal life

Young was married three times and had three children. Her first marriage was to actor Grant Withers in 1930. The marriage was annulled the following year. From September 1933 to June 1934, she had a well-publicized affair with actor Spencer Tracy (who was married to Louise Tracy), her co-star in Man's Castle. In 1940, Young married producer Tom Lewis. They had two sons: Peter Lewis (of the San Francisco rock band Moby Grape); and Christopher Lewis, a film director. Young and Lewis divorced in 1969.

In 1993, Young married for the third and final time, to the fashion designer Jean Louis. Their marriage lasted until his death in April 1997. Young was godmother to Marlo Thomas (daughter of TV star Danny Thomas).

A smoker since the age of eight, a then underweight Young quit the habit in the mid-1980s and regained 10 pounds.

Judy Lewis
Young and Clark Gable were the romantic leads of the 1935 Twentieth Century Pictures film The Call of the Wild. Young was then 22 years old; Gable was 34 and married to Maria “Ria” Langham. During filming, Young became pregnant by Gable.

Young did not want to damage her career or Gable's. She knew that if Twentieth Century Pictures found out about the pregnancy, they would pressure her to have an abortion; Young, a devout Catholic, considered abortion a mortal sin. Young, her sisters, and her mother came up with a plan to hide the pregnancy and then pass off the child as adopted. When Young's pregnancy began to advance, she went on a "vacation" to England. After returning to California, she gave an interview from her bed, covered in blankets; at that time, she stated that her long movie absence was due to a condition she had had since childhood. Young gave birth to a daughter, Judith, on November 6, 1935, in Venice, California. Young named Judith after St. Jude because he was the patron saint of (among other things) difficult situations. Weeks after her birth, Judith was placed in an orphanage. Judith spent the next 19 months in various "hideaways and orphanages" before being re-united with her mother; Young then claimed that she had adopted Judith. After Young married Tom Lewis, Judith took Lewis's last name.

Few in Hollywood were fooled by the ruse. Judith (Judy) Lewis bore a strong resemblance to Gable, and her true parentage was widely rumored in entertainment circles. When Lewis was 31 years old, she confronted Young about her parentage; Young privately admitted that she was Lewis's birth mother, stating that Lewis was "a walking mortal sin". Young refused to confirm or comment publicly on the rumors until 1999, when Joan Wester Anderson wrote Young's authorized biography. In interviews with Anderson for the book, Young stated that Lewis was her biological child and the product of a brief affair with Gable. Young would not allow the book to be published until after her death.

In 2015, Linda Lewis, the wife of Young's son, Christopher, stated publicly that in 1998, a then-85-year-old Young had told Lewis that Gable had raped her. According to Linda Lewis, Young added that no consensual intimate contact had occurred between Gable and herself. Young had never disclosed the rape to anyone. Lewis stated that Young shared this information only after learning of the concept of date rape from watching Larry King Live; she had previously believed it was a woman's job to fend off men's amorous advances and had perceived her inability to thwart Gable's attack as a moral failing on her part. Linda Lewis said that the family remained silent about Young's rape claim until after both Young and Judy Lewis had died.

Politics
Young was a life-long Republican. In 1952, she appeared in radio, print, and magazine ads in support of Dwight D. Eisenhower in his campaign for US president. She attended his inauguration in 1953, along with Anita Louise, Louella Parsons, Jane Russell, Dick Powell, June Allyson, and Lou Costello, among others. She was a vocal supporter of Richard Nixon and Ronald Reagan in their presidential campaigns in 1968 and 1980, respectively. Young was also an active member of the Hollywood Republican Committee, with her close friends Irene Dunne, Ginger Rogers, William Holden, George Murphy, Fred Astaire, and John Wayne.

Later life
From the time of Young's retirement in the 1960s until not long before her death, she devoted herself to volunteer work for charities and churches, together with her friends of many years: Jane Wyman, Irene Dunne, and Rosalind Russell. She was a member of the Church of the Good Shepherd in Beverly Hills, and the Catholic Motion Picture Guild in Beverly Hills, California. Young, a devout Catholic, also worked with various Catholic charities after her acting career. Young briefly came out of retirement to star in two television films: Christmas Eve (1986), and Lady in a Corner (1989). She won a Golden Globe Award for the former, and was nominated for the latter.

In 1972, a jury in Los Angeles awarded Young $550,000 in a lawsuit against NBC for breach of contract. Filed in 1966, the suit contended that NBC had allowed foreign television outlets to re-run old episodes of The Loretta Young Show, without excluding, as agreed by the parties, the opening segment in which Young made her entrance. Young testified that her image had been damaged by portraying her in "outdated gowns". She had sought damages of $1.9 million.

Death
Young died of ovarian cancer on August 12, 2000, at the home of her maternal half-sister, Georgiana Young (the wife of actor Ricardo Montalbán) in Los Angeles, California. She was interred in the family plot in Holy Cross Cemetery in Culver City, California. Her ashes were buried in the grave of her mother, Gladys Belzer.

Filmography

Radio appearances

See also

 List of actors with Academy Award nominations

References

Further reading
 
 .
 "Tuning in to Women in Television" (National Women's History Museum)
 Morella, Joe and Epstein, Edward Z (1986) Loretta Young, An Extraordinary Life, Delacorte Press,

External links

 
 
 
 Loretta Young at TVGuide.com
 Photographs and bibliography
 Loretta Young (Aveleyman)

1913 births
2000 deaths
20th-century American actresses
Actresses from Los Angeles
Actresses from Salt Lake City
American child actresses
American film actresses
American people of Luxembourgian descent
Catholics from Utah
Catholics from California
American silent film actresses
American television actresses
Best Actress Academy Award winners
Best Miniseries or Television Movie Actress Golden Globe winners
Burials at Holy Cross Cemetery, Culver City
Deaths from cancer in California
Deaths from ovarian cancer
Outstanding Performance by a Lead Actress in a Drama Series Primetime Emmy Award winners
California Republicans
WAMPAS Baby Stars